The 2016 Hofstra Pride softball team represents Hofstra University in the 2016 NCAA Division I softball season. The Pride compete in the Colonial Athletic Association and are led by second-year head coach Larissa Anderson.  Hofstra plays its home games at Bill Edwards Stadium in Hempstead, New York. Hofstra won the 2015 CAA Softball championship.

Roster

References

Hofstra Pride softball seasons